Pro NRW was a right-wing political party in Germany taking part in regional elections of North Rhine-Westphalia. The party achieved 1.5% in the North Rhine-Westphalia state election.

References

External links

 

Far-right political parties in Germany
North Rhine-Westphalia
Anti-immigration politics in Germany
Anti-Islam sentiment in Germany
German nationalist political parties